HT, Ht, hT, or ht may refer to:

Businesses and organisations
 Aeromist-Kharkiv (defunct airline with IATA airline code HT)
 Air Horizont (IATA airline code HT)
 Hizb ut-Tahrir, an Islamic political organisation
 Hrvatski Telekom, a Croatian telecom company
 HaparandaTornio Bandy or HT Bandy, a Swedish-Finnish bandy club
 HT Media, Indian news media company
 Hindustan Times, newspaper owned by HT Media
Tianjin Air Cargo (IATA airline code HT)

Science and technology

Medicine
 Histology technician
 5-HT, a monoamine neurotransmitter
 Hematocrit, a blood test that measures the volume percentage of red blood cells

Electronics and computing
 HT (vacuum tube), the high-tension power supply for vacuum tube circuits
 Handie-Talkie, a Motorola portable radio transceiver
 Handheld transceiver or walkie-talkie
High Throughput, in the wireless networking standard IEEE 802.11n
 Horizontal Tab, used in the C0 control code set (see Tab key#Tab characters)
 Hyper-threading (HT or HTT), Intel name for multithreading
 HyperTransport, computer processor interconnection technology

Other uses in science and technology
 Hectotesla (hT), an SI unit of magnetic flux density
 HT, a type of sulfur mustard war gas
 Howard T. Odum, US ecologist, known as H.T.

Other uses
 Haiti (ISO 3166-1 alpha-2 country code)
 .ht, Internet country code for Haiti
 Haitian Creole language (ISO 639 alpha-2 code)
 Hanshin Tigers (Japan), a Nippon Professional Baseball team
 Hat tip, used on the Internet (especially on 140 character Twitter) as acknowledgement of source
 Height (abbreviation ht.)
 HT, hors taxe ("before tax" in French), a French price exclusive of VAT.
 Hull Maintenance Technician, abbreviated HT, a US Navy occupational rating
 Halftime, the halfway point of a sports match

See also

 
 
 
 HTS (disambiguation)